Re-Mit is the 29th studio album by the English post-punk group, The Fall. It was released on 13 May 2013 via Cherry Red Records. The album features Mark E. Smith (lead vocals), Peter Greenway (lead guitar), Keiron Melling (drums), Elena Poulou (keyboards, vocals) and David Spurr (bass), and marks the first time in the history of the Fall that the group have released four consecutive studio albums recorded with the same line-up.

Release
The album was announced in early 2013. The album track list was revealed on 11 April 2013. The first single from the album, "Sir William Wray", was released on 20 April for the 2013 Record Store Day. The single contains the alternative versions of the album tracks "Sir William Wray" and "Hittite Man," and was limited to 1500 copies. "Victrola Time" was recorded at the Ersatz GB sessions in 2011 and later overdubbed for the 7" single "Night of the Humerons", where it featured as the lead track. It was released as part of Record Store Day in 2012, in a limited edition of 1000 copies.

The band toured the United Kingdom in May 2013 in support of the album.

Re-Mit entered the UK Album Chart during the week ending 25 May 2013 and peaked at number 40.

Reception

Upon its release, Re-Mit received some critical acclaim. At Metacritic, which assigns a weighted average score out of 100 to reviews and ratings from mainstream critics, the album has received a metascore of 63, based on 21 reviews, indicating "generally favorable reviews."

Track listing

Personnel
The Fall
 Mark E. Smith – lead vocals, production
 Peter Greenway – lead guitar, backing vocals
 Keiron Melling – drums
 Elena Poulou – keyboards, vocals
 David Spurr – bass, backing vocals
Additional personnel
 Tim Presley – guitar on tracks 1, 3 and 7
Technical
 Simon 'Dingo' Archer – engineering
 Grant Showbiz – engineering
 Andy Pearce – mastering
 Suzanne Smith – cover artwork
 Anthony Frost – cover artwork
 Becky Stewart – cover artwork

Notes

References

External links
 Semi-official the Fall website

2013 albums
The Fall (band) albums
Cherry Red Records albums